Boccia at the 2010 Asian Para Games were held in Zhongda Gymnasium, Guangzhou, China PR from December 13 to December 18. There were four gold medals in this sport.

Medal summary

Medal table
Retrieved from Asian Para Games 2010 Official Website.

Medalists

Result

Individual - BC1

Group Round

Group A

Group C

Group B

Group D

Final Round

Individual - BC2

Group Round

Group A

Group C

Group B

Group D

Final Round

Individual - BC3

Group Round
Group A

Group B

Group C

Final Round

Individual - BC4

Group Round
Group A

Group B

Group C

Final Round

References

2010 Asian Para Games events